Glasgow Rutherglen was a constituency of the Scottish Parliament (Holyrood). It elected one Member of the Scottish Parliament (MSP) by the plurality (first past the post) method of election.

From the 2011 Scottish Parliament election, the seat of Glasgow Rutherglen was redrawn and renamed Rutherglen.

Electoral region
See also Glasgow (Scottish Parliament electoral region)

The region covered the Glasgow City council area and a north-western portion of the South Lanarkshire council area.

Characteristics
The town of Rutherglen is the oldest royal burgh in Scotland, and 500 years older than the royal burgh of Glasgow. At its northern and western borders it blends into Glasgow's suburbs and the vast Castlemilk housing scheme. It was traditionally a Conservative seat, and has always striven to maintain some autonomy since it was absorbed by Glasgow in the 1970s. However, the changes in the 1970s led the Westminster constituency to be mostly made up of council estates south-east of the Glasgow city centre and it became a Labour safe seat. The seat included not only Rutherglen itself but also the town of Cambuslang, and the housing schemes at Fernhill, Toryglen and Whitlawburn. Steel and pottery have been major industries in the past, but both have been in decline over the last 30 years. Although now mostly outside Glasgow local government area, the constituency was still seen as a safe Labour seat. There were no surprises in the 1999 elections, which saw Janis Hughes win the seat with a majority of 25% of the vote.

Member of the Scottish Parliament

Election results

See also
 Politics of Glasgow

Scottish Parliament constituencies and regions 1999–2011
Cambuslang
Rutherglen
Politics of Glasgow
1999 establishments in Scotland
Constituencies established in 1999
2011 disestablishments in Scotland
Constituencies disestablished in 2011
Politics of South Lanarkshire